Elijah Alick (born 28 March 1996) is an Australian professional rugby league footballer who currently plays for the Brisbane Broncos in the National Rugby League (NRL).

References

Living people
1996 births
Australian rugby league players
People educated at Brisbane State High School
Rugby league wingers